Statistics of Primera Fuerza in season 1921–22.

Overview
In 1921 the Campeonato del Centenario was played from August 7, 1921 - September 25, 1921. Club España became champion as  Asturias walked off in the final. For 1922 no league was held, but 2 editions of the Copa Covadonga were played. Copa Covadonga II started in October 1922. Copa Covadonga was contested by 7 teams, and Club España won both championship. In Copa Covadonga II Club España beat  Asturias after they had to abandon the game since 3 of their players were injured.

1921

Campeonato del Centenario

Matches

First round

Bye: Pachuca

Second round

Playoff First Round

Second round

Playoff

Bracket

Semifinals

Final

Torneo del Centenario
Once the "Torneo del Centenario" was finished, both leagues (Mexicana and Nacional), continue playing, apparently neither ended; however, there are reports that both conclude, if so, neither of the reported champions ( Asturias and RC España) were recognized. In the "Liga Mexicana" played only four teams (Deportivo Internacional and Morelos withdrew and joined Tranvías) and in the Liga Nacional joined Aurrera.

Liga Mexicana (official) participant teams:
 Asturias
 Germania FV
 México FC
 Tranvías

Liga Nacional (unofficial) participant teams:
 RC España
 América
 Luz y Fuerza
 L'Amicale Française
 Reforma AC
 Aurrerá

1922

Copa Covadonga 1922 I

Final

Copa Covadonga 1922 II

Final

References
Mexico - List of final tables (RSSSF)

Primera Fuerza seasons
Mex
1921–22 in Mexican football